Agdistis sanctaehelenae is a moth in the family Pterophoridae. It was described by Edith Wollaston in 1879 and is known from Saint Helena in the South Atlantic.

References

Agdistinae
Moths described in 1879